The Rebel Angels is Canadian author Robertson Davies's most noted novel, after those that form his Deptford Trilogy.

First published by Macmillan of Canada in 1981, The Rebel Angels is the first of the three connected novels of Davies' Cornish Trilogy. It was followed by What's Bred in the Bone (1985), and The Lyre of Orpheus (1988). Like the rest of the Cornish Trilogy, the novel takes place in the same universe as the Deptford Trilogy, with the major characters Clement Hollier and John Parlabane being alums of Colborne College (the college where Dunstan Ramsay taught history in Fifth Business) and former classmates of Boy Staunton's son David.

Plot

The Rebel Angels follows several faculty and staff of the fictional College of St. John and Holy Ghost, affectionately referred to as "Spook".

The story, like many of Davies', is notable for very strongly drawn and memorable characters:

 The defrocked monk Parlabane, a brilliant and sinister sodomite with a thundering voice and voracious appetite;
 Anglican priest and professor of New Testament Greek Simon Darcourt;
 Maria Theotoky, a graduate student researching Rabelais;
 Clement Hollier, a frazzled and absentminded professor; and 
 Urquhart McVarish, a greedy and manipulative counterpoint to Hollier.

The novel's narration alternates between Theotoky's and Darcourt's points of view. Darcourt is attempting to write a history of the university based on Aubrey's Brief Lives.

Much of the story is set in motion by the death of eccentric art patron and collector Francis Cornish. Hollier, McVarish, and Darcourt are the executors of Cornish's complicated will, which includes material that Hollier wants for his studies. The deceased's nephew Arthur Cornish, who stands to inherit the fortune, is also a character.

Background

Many of the characters (including Parlabane and McVarish) were based on college acquaintances of Davies; their stories are recounted in Judith Skelton Grant's biography Robertson Davies: Man of Myth (1994) and Brian Busby's Character Parts: Who's Really Who in CanLit (2003). As well, many believe that Davies based the College of St. John and the Holy Ghost (or "Spook" as it is affectionately called in the novel) on Toronto's Trinity College. Evidence for this connection includes numerous similarities between the fictional and the real life college (including architectural style, layout of rooms, age, and religious affiliation); the fact that Davies taught at Trinity College for twenty years and lived across the street from Trinity while master of Massey College; and perhaps most convincingly that a picture of Trinity's central tower is prominently featured on the cover of the novel's first edition. Equally plausible is the belief that Ploughwright College in the book is patterned after Davies's own Massey College. This connection is supported by the fact that much of the fortune donated by the Massey family to the University of Toronto for the founding of Massey College was originally made in the manufacture of farm equipment. Like the real-life Massey College, Ploughwright is a graduate college where scholars are invited to partake in interdisciplinary discussions and High Table dinners.

Reception
Dave Langford reviewed The Rebel Angels for White Dwarf #45, and stated that "Not for the squeamish, it features a murder whose inventive nastiness makes the destruction of whole shiploads of the people in Downbelow Station pale into insignificance."

References

Brian Busby. Character Parts: Who's Really Who in CanLit. Toronto: Knopf Canada, 2003.
Judith Skelton Grant. Robertson Davies: Man of Myth. Toronto: Viking Canada, 1994.

External links
 

1981 Canadian novels
Novels by Robertson Davies
Novels set in Toronto